The Samsung Galaxy Tab A8 is a tablet computer by Samsung. It was announced on December 15, 2021 and released on January 17, 2022. It comes in four combinations: 4G Cellular/Wi-Fi, Wi-Fi only and each of these with either 32GB, 64GB, or 128GB internal storage. It accepts MicroSD cards up to 1TB. Available colors are Gray, Pink Gold, and Silver.

The other specifications are:

CPU: 4 core, 2GHz

Display: 10.5", 1920x1200 resolution

Cameras: 8MP rear, 5MP front

Storage: 4GB RAM, 64GB/128GB ROM + up to 1TB MicroSD

Miscellaneous: USB 2.0 Type-C, Bluetooth 5.0, 3.5mm Stereo plug, 7040mAh battery, 246.8 x 161.9 x 6.9 mm

The Galaxy Tab A8 ships with Android 11, but it can be upgraded to Android 13.

References 

A8
Android (operating system) devices
Samsung Galaxy
Tablet computers introduced in 2021